Kinnesswood, possibly from the  ("head of the waterfall of the wood") is a village in Perth and Kinross, Scotland, and is in the historic county of Kinross-shire. It lies to the east of Loch Leven, on the A911 road, below Bishop Hill in the Lomond Hills.

Notable residents
It was the birthplace in 1746 of the poet Michael Bruce who was born into a weaver's family and is remembered for his nature poetry in poems such as 'Ode To The Cuckoo' which Edmund Burke described as "the most beautiful lyric in our language". Bruce died from consumption at the early age of 21.

In 1829 meteorologist Alexander Buchan was born here.

References

Villages in Perth and Kinross